The battle of Khorramshahr, also known in Iran as the liberation of Khorramshahr was the Iranian recapture of the city of Khorramshahr on 24 May 1982, during the Iran–Iraq War. The city had been captured by the Iraqis earlier in the war, on 26 October 1980, shortly after the Iraqi invasion of Iran. The successful retaking of the city was part of Iran's Operation Beit ol-Moqaddas. It is perceived as a turning point in the war; and the liberation of the city is annually celebrated in Iran on 24 May.

Battle

Following its capture, the Iranian city of Khorramshahr remained under Iraqi control until April 1982, when the Iranians launched Operation Beit ol-Moqaddas to recapture the province of Khuzestan. The initial phase of the operation took place from 24 April to 12 May 1982 and consisted of approximately 70,000 Iranian Army troops and Revolutionary Guards, who succeeded in pushing the Iraqi forces out of the Ahvaz–Susangerd area while sustaining heavy casualties. The Iraqis withdrew to Khorramshahr and, on 20 May, launched a vigorous but unsuccessful counterattack against the Iranians. Iran then launched an all-out assault on Khorramshahr and overran two Iraqi defensive lines in the Pol-e Now and Shalamcheh region. The Iranians concentrated near the Shatt al-Arab (known as the Arvand Rud in Iran) waterway, besieged Khorramshahr, and recaptured the city on 24 May 1982, after two days of intense and bloody fighting.

Aftermath and legacy

In retaking Khorramshahr, the Iranians captured approximately 19,000 soldiers from a now-demoralized Iraqi Army. Saddam Hussein was shocked and infuriated by the defeat and by the fact that the Iranians had pushed on despite sustaining heavy casualties. The Iranians had even committed their reserves in order to keep on driving back the Iraqis. After the defeat, Saddam Hussein executed several of his top generals, such as the commander of the 9th Armoured Division.

Calls for a United Nations-mandated ceasefire in the Iran–Iraq War were made three days after the liberation of Khorramshahr, and officials of both countries began discussing such a possibility.

The anniversary of the liberation of Khorramshahr is annually observed in Iran on 24 May.

Sevom Khordad, an Iranian air defense system, is named for the battle.

In popular culture
The liberation of Khorramshahr is the subject of a number of wartime films, such as 1982's Another Growth by Homayun Purmand, the Pasdaran Army (Revolutionary Guard) Television Unit's 1983 documentary Recapturing Khorramshahr, and Kiumarth Monazzah's Forty Witnesses – The Second Narrative: Liberation of Khorramshahr (1983).

A popular sad Persian song, "Mammad Naboodi" (meaning "Mammad [colloquial variant of Mohammad], you were not there [to see the city liberated]"), by Gholam Koveitipoor, is about Mohammad Jahanara, the Revolutionary Guard commander who was one of the last few Iranians to leave Khorramshahr when it fell to the Iraqis. He went on to fight in the Siege of Abadan and lead Iranian forces to recapture Khorramshahr; but he died on 24 May, in a plane crash, before the actual liberation of the city.

See also
 Karun River
 Chess with the Doomsday Machine
 Eternal Fragrance
 Noureddin, Son of Iran
 One Woman's War: Da (Mother)

References

External links

 Khorramshahr Battle Continues (Video)

Military operations of the Iran–Iraq War in 1982
History of Khuzestan Province
April 1982 events in Asia
May 1982 events in Asia